This is a list of programs broadcast by Rede Bandeirantes (also known as "Band"), a Brazilian television network. Part of the Bandeirantes Group, it aired for the first time in 1967. Currently it is the fourth TV network in Brazil by the ratings.

Current programs

Series

Reality shows

Game shows

Variety

News and information

Sports

Programming

Coverage
 Bundesliga (2020–present)
 National Basketball Association (1987-2001, 2019-present)
 Formula One (1980, 2021-present)
 Campeonato Brasileiro Série C (2019-present)
 SFT (2018-present)
 Stock Car Brasil (2020-present)
 Porsche Cup Brasil (2021-present)
 Copa Truck (2021-present)
 Ultimate Fighting Championship (2023-present)
 Campeonato Carioca (1977-1983; 1991-1999, 2009-2016, 2023-present)
 Formula E (2023-present)

Special 
 Band Folia (Brazilian Carnival coverage) (2000–present)

Children's programming 
 Band Kids (2000–present)

Movie blocks 
 Cinema na Madrugada (1979–present)
 Sessão Especial (1978–present)
 Sessão Livre (1992–present)
 Top Cine (2007-present)
 Cine Ação (2020-present)
 Cine+ (2018-present)
 Cine Privé (1992-2010, 2019-present)
 Cine Band (1996-2006, 2016)
 Domingo no Cinema (1996-present)

Former programs

Late night 
 Agora É Tarde (2011–2015)
 Amaury Jr. (2018-2019)
 Claquete (2011–2013)

Variety 
 A Grande Chance (2007-2008)
 Agora é Tarde (2011-2015)
 Aqui na Band (2019)
 Atualíssima (2007-2009)
 Bem Família (2005-2009)
 Boa Noite Brasil (1982-1985, 2003-2007)
 Cozinha do Bork (2018)
 CQC (2008-2015)
 Dia Dia (1987-2005, 2009-2019)
 Homenagem ao Artista (2007-2008)
 Hora da Verdade (2001-2005)
 Jogo da Vida (2003-2005)
 Márcia (2005-2010)
 Pânico na Band (2012-2017, 2023)
 Popcorn TV (2010)
 Pra Valer (2005-2007)
 Programa Raul Gil (2006-2010)
 Raul Gil Tamanho Família (2008-2009)
 Receita Minuto (2002-2005)
 Sabadaço (2002-2007)
 Superpoderosas (2018)
 Video News (2009-2012, 2018)
 Zoo (2013–2015)

News 
 Acontece (1990-1999, 2012)
 Agrojornal (1989-1992)
 Band Notícias (2019-2021)
 Bandeira 1 (1987-1990)
 Boa Tarde (2009-2010)
 Café com Jornal (2014-2020)
 Cara a Cara (1986-1994)
 Dia a Dia News (1997-2001)
 Diário Rural (1994-2001)
 Documento Especial (1998-1999)
 Domingo com Márcia (2002-2003)
 Entrevista Coletiva (1992-1997)
 Fatos de Domingo (2001)
 Fogo Cruzado (1997-1999)
 Jornal de Domingo (1993-1997)
 Na Linha de Frente (1997-2001, 2020)
 Realidade (1999-2000)
 Realidade Rural (1991-1992)
 Rede Cidade (1993-1998)
 Tempo Quente (1998)
 Titulares da Notícia (1967-1977)
 TV Trânsito (2009)

 Sports 
 Apito Final (1994-1999, 2009-2010)
 Band Clássicos (2011-2012)
 Band Esporte (1994-2001)
 Band Mania (2010-2011, 2013)
 Bola no Chão (2007)
 Bola na Mesa (1980-1982)
 Desafio (1986-1991)
 Deu Olé (2012–2013)
 Esporte Agora (2000-2002)
 Esporte Total na Geral (2005)
 Faixa Especial do Esporte (1992-1995)
 Faixa Nobre do Esporte (1991-1998)
 Futebol Compacto (2007-2009)
 Gol: O Grande Momento do Futebol (1983–2016)
 Por Dentro da Bola (2007)
 Show de Bola (2004)
 Super Domingo Esportivo (1980-1983)
 Super Técnico (1999-2001)
 Valle Tudo (1990-1996)
 Vídeo Gol (2004-2005)

 Coverage 
 FIFA Confederations Cup (tournament abolished after the end of 2017)
 UEFA Champions League (2005-2006; 2010-2018)
 FIFA Club World Cup (1985-1993, 2000, 2009, 2012-2013, 2022)
 Copa do Brasil (1989, 1999-2000, 2007-2013, 2015)
 Brazilian Soccer Championship A-Series (1967-1985, 1989-1999, 2007-2015)
 Brazilian Soccer Championship B-Series (1992, 1997, 2011-2013)
 Soccer States championships (1967-1999, 2007-2016)
 CART/Indy Car World Series (1984-1992)
 IndyCar Series (1996 (IRL only)–2001, 2004-2020)
 MotoGP (1993-1996)
 FIVB Volleyball World League (1991-1996, 2015)
 FIVB Volleyball World Grand Prix (1993-1996, 2015)
 Volleyball World Championship (1986-1994)
 FIFA World Cup (1986, 1990, 1994, 1998, 2010 and 2014)
 UEFA Euro (1996, 2012, 2016)
 Summer Olympics (1980, 1984, 1988, 1992, 1996, 2000, 2004, 2008, 2016)
 Winter Olympics (1998, 2002, 2014)
 Fórmula Truck (2000-2004, 2006-2017)
 Campeonato Sudamericano de GT (2012-2013)
 Campeonato Brasileiro de Turismo (2013-2014)
 Top Series (2013)
 Novo Basquete Brasil (2016–2019)
 Serie A (1983-2001, 2020-2021)
 Premier League (1991-1992)
 La Liga (1994-2003)
 Russian Premier League (2020-2021)
 Campeonato Brasileiro Sub-20 (2019-2021)
 Campeonato Brasileiro de Aspirantes (2020-2021, nunca foi mostrado)
 Copa do Brasil Sub-20 (2020-2021)
 Campeonato Brasileiro de Futebol Feminino (2019-2022)

 Special 
 Parintins Folklore Festival (2008–2014)
 Miss Brasil (2003–2019)
 Miss Universe (2003–2018)

 Reality shows/Game shows Desafio em Dose Dupla Brasil (Dual Survival)A Fuga (Raid the Cage)O Sócio (The Profit)Exathlon Brasil (Exathlon)Polícia 24h (COPS)1001 Perguntas (Game Show)O Mundo Segundo os BrasileirosÀ Primeira Vista (First Dates) (2017)X Factor Brasil (2016)Shark Tank Brasil - Negociando com Tubarões (Shark Tank) (2016-2017)Bate & Volta (2016)Sabe ou Não Sabe (2014-2015)Quem Fica em Pé? (Who's Still Standing?) (2012-2013)Mulheres Ricas (The Real Housewives) (2012-2013)Perdidos na Tribo (Ticket To The Tribes) (2012)Projeto Fashion (Project Runway) (2011)The Phone – A Missão (The Phone) (2011)É Tudo Improviso (Whose Line Is It Anyway?) (2010-2011)Busão do Brasil (The Bus) (2010)E24 (Medical reality show) (2009-2012)Zero Bala (2009-2010)É o Amor (2008)A Grande Chance (The Alphabet Game) (2007-2008)Quem Pode mais? (Battle of the sexes game show) (2008)Cidade Nota 10 (City vs City) (2005)Joga Bonito (2006)Joga 10 (2005)Na Pressão (2004)Sobcontrole (2002-2003)Território Livre (2000)Supermarket (Supermarket Sweep) (1990-1998) Children's programming 
 Sítio do Picapau Amarelo (1967–1969)
 Mundo Animado'' (2018–2020)

Notes

External links 

Rede Bandeirantes
Original programming by Brazilian television network or channel